Aleksandr Konstantinovich Chekhirkin (born 13 March 1986) is a Russian Greco-Roman wrestler. He is a three-times national champion, having won in 2009, 2017 and 2018. Internationally, Chekhirkin won the 2014 European Wrestling Championships in Vantaa, Finland, defeating 2012 Olympic silver medallist Arsen Julfalakyan in the final. He was originally runner-up at the 2017 World Wrestling Championships, losing to Serbian wrestler Viktor Nemeš, but his medal was later stripped off due to doping (glucocorticoid). At the 2018 World Wrestling Championships he earned the gold medal for the Russian Federation at 77 kilos.

In March 2021, he qualified at the European Qualification Tournament to compete at the 2020 Summer Olympics in Tokyo, Japan.

References

External links 
 
 
 

1986 births
Living people
Sportspeople from Rostov-on-Don
Russian male sport wrestlers
World Wrestling Championships medalists
European Games gold medalists for Russia
Wrestlers at the 2019 European Games
European Games medalists in wrestling
European Wrestling Championships medalists
Wrestlers at the 2020 Summer Olympics
Olympic wrestlers of Russia
21st-century Russian people